Bonnie Shade is a historic plantation house located at Florence, Florence County, South Carolina.  It was built in 1854, and is a mid-19th century Greek Revival style raised cottage.  It features corner pilasters and free-standing columns supporting the pediment and portico.

It was listed on the National Register of Historic Places in 1978.

References

Plantation houses in South Carolina
Houses on the National Register of Historic Places in South Carolina
Greek Revival houses in South Carolina
Houses completed in 1854
Houses in Florence County, South Carolina
National Register of Historic Places in Florence County, South Carolina
Buildings and structures in Florence, South Carolina